The men's hammer throw at the 2019 Asian Athletics Championships was held on 23 and 24 April.

Medalists

Results

Qualification
Qualification rule:  Qualifying performance 70.00 (Q) or at least 12 best performers (q) qualify for the final

Final

References

Hammer
Hammer throw at the Asian Athletics Championships